Charles Fall (born March 12, 1989) is a member of the New York State Assembly, representing the 61st District since 2019. He is a Democrat.  The district includes portions of the North Shore of Staten Island. The first Muslim elected to the Assembly, Fall was born and raised on Staten Island following his parents' immigration from Guinea. He previously served as the Staten Island borough director for Mayor of New York City Bill de Blasio, as well as the Chief of Staff to the New York City Parks Borough Commissioner for Staten Island. Fall has earned degrees from both Southwestern College and Pace University. He resides in Mariners Harbor.

In 2018, Assemblyman Matthew Titone announced that he would not seek re-election. In a three-way primary, Fall won the Democratic nomination.  He went on to win the general election easily and was sworn in for his first term on January 3, 2019.

References

External links 
 Charles Fall - New York State Assembly (official site)

1989 births
Living people
Democratic Party members of the New York State Assembly
21st-century American politicians
Politicians from Staten Island
Southwestern College (Kansas) alumni
Pace University alumni
People from Mariners Harbor, Staten Island